Kamal Derwish (1973 – November 3, 2002) was an American citizen killed by the CIA as part of a covert targeted killing mission in Yemen on November 3, 2002. The CIA used an RQ-1 Predator drone to shoot a Hellfire missile, destroying the vehicle in which he was driving with five others.

Derwish had been closely linked to the growing religious fundamentalism of the Lackawanna Six, a group of Muslim-Americans who had attended lectures in his apartment near Buffalo, New York.

That an American citizen had been killed by the CIA without trial drew criticism. American authorities quickly back-pedaled on their stories celebrating the death of Derwish, instead noting they had been unaware he was in the car which they said had been targeted for its other occupants, including Abu Ali al-Harithi, believed to have played some role in the USS Cole bombing. According to former FBI agent Ali Soufan, Derwish was al-Harithi's main assistant.

Life
Derwish was born at Mercy Hospital in South Buffalo, grew up in and according to some sources continued to live "on and off" in the suburb of Lackawanna. According to PBS Frontline Derwish left with his family to return to Yemen when he was five years old, and that after his father was killed in a car accident, Derwish went to live with relatives in Saudi Arabia where he was raised and educated. According to U.S. intelligence sources the Saudi government deported Derwish in 1997 for alleged extremist activities. After a year in Yemen he returned to his hometown of Lackawanna in 1998.

He briefly worked for the plastics factory in the area, but also frequently traveled overseas building up an "air of mystery" around him, as he combined religious fervour with Western ways.

He possibly used the name "Ahmed Hijazi".

Return to New York
Derwish returned home to Lackawanna in 2000, and moved in with his uncle until Yahya Goba offered to share an apartment with him. He was visibly upset with the "decline" of the Buffalo suburb, noting how much the standard of living had fallen since his earlier days in the Ward.

Derwish was described as a "charismatic, bear-like bearded man" who gave khutbahs at the local mosque urging young Muslims to travel overseas to support Mujaheddin struggles in Muslim lands under attack. When his "edgy" lectures tired the mosque's leadership, he began holding informal gatherings at his Wilkes-Barre apartment, buying pizzas and discussing Islam with anyone interested, often watching videos that showed atrocities committed against Muslim populations in Bosnia, Chechnya and similar war-torn nations.

The FBI later claimed to have been alarmed when they discovered he had spoken to Tawfig bin Attash and Saad bin Laden.

Targeted killing
On November 3, 2002, Derwish and al-Harithi were part of a convoy of vehicles moving through the Yemeni desert trying to meet someone, unaware that their contact was cooperating with US forces to lure them into a trap.  As their driver spoke on satellite phone, trying to figure out why the two parties couldn't see each other if they were both at the rendezvous point, a Predator drone launched a Hellfire missile, killing everybody in the vehicle.  CIA officers in Djibouti had received clearance for the attack from director George Tenet.

Derwish's uncle provided a DNA sample which showed that Derwish had been killed in the attack.

Since Yemen and Djibouti were not involved in the War on Terror, and no attempt was made to arrest the men in the convoy before killing them, the attack was protested as an extrajudicial execution and a violation of human rights.

See also
CIA activities in Yemen

References

1973 births
2002 deaths
People from Lackawanna, New York
Deaths by drone strikes of the Central Intelligence Agency in Yemen
Buffalo Six
Islamic fundamentalism in the United States